Champ Creek is a  long 1st order tributary to the Ararat River in Surry County, North Carolina.  This stream is the only one of its name in the United States.

Course
Champ Creek rises in a pond on the Faulkner Creek divide about 2 miles east of Mount Airy, North Carolina.  Champ Creek then flows southwest to join the Ararat River about 0.5 miles northeast of Mount Airy.

Watershed
Champ Creek drains  of area, receives about 47.8 in/year of precipitation, has a wetness index of 337.25, and is about 51% forested.

See also
List of rivers of North Carolina

References

Rivers of North Carolina
Rivers of Surry County, North Carolina